The 2017 Texas Tech Red Raiders baseball team represents Texas Tech University during the 2017 NCAA Division I baseball season. The Red Raiders play their home games at Dan Law Field at Rip Griffin Park as a member of the Big 12 Conference. They are led by head coach Tim Tadlock, in his 5th season at Texas Tech.

Schedule and results

Rankings

References

Texas Tech Red Raiders
Texas Tech Red Raiders baseball seasons
Texas Tech